The 1951 California Golden Bears football team was an American football team that represented the University of California, Berkeley during the 1951 college football season. Under head coach Pappy Waldorf, the team compiled an overall record of 8–2 and 5–2 in conference. Because of the two losses and unlike the previous three seasons, the Bears were not invited to play at the Rose Bowl.

Schedule

References

California
California Golden Bears football seasons
California Golden Bears football